Kilminchy GAA was a Gaelic football club in Portlaoise, County Laois, Republic of Ireland.  The Kilminchy area now forms part of the catchment area of Portlaoise GAA club.

History
In its earlier incarnation Kilminchy won the Laois Junior Football Championship in 1947 and the Laois Minor Football Championship in 1950.

The club was reformed in 2003 in an attempt to capitalise on the growing population in the eastern end of the town of Portlaoise. However, the club lasted only a brief few years before ceasing to field teams.

References

Former Gaelic Athletic Association clubs in County Laois